This is a list of the primary assignments that was used for MLS matches, U.S national team matches, and select international club friendly broadcasts.

Former

Play-by-play announcers
 Jon Champion (2019–2022)
 Adrian Healey (2011–2022)
 Steve Cangialosi (2016–2022)
 Glenn Davis (2002–2022)
 Andres Cordero (2021–2022)
 Jonathan Yardley (2021–2022)
 Kevin Egan (2021–2022)
 Tyler Terens (2022)
 Jake Zivin (2022)
 Bob Ley (1996–1997)
 Phil Schoen (1996–1999)
 Jack Edwards (2000–2002)
 Rob Stone (2002–2011)
 Dave O'Brien (2006–2007)
 JP Dellacamera (1996–2010)
 Ian Darke (2010–2011)

Color commentators
 Ty Keough (1996–2003)
 Eric Wynalda (2004–2007)
 Bruce Arena (2006)
 Tommy Smyth (2007)
 Kyle Martino (2009–2010)
 John Harkes (2008–2011)
 Julie Foudy (2007–2009)
 Alexi Lalas (1996–2014)
 Taylor Twellman (2010–2022)
 Alejandro Moreno (2014–2022)
 Brian Dunseth (2014–2022)
 Kasey Keller (2014–2022)
 Herculez Gomez (2017-2022)
 Shep Messing (2020–2022)
 Danny Higginbotham (2021–2022)
 Lori Lindsey (2021–2022)
 Kyndra de St. Aubin (2021–2022)
 Ben Olsen (2022)

Sideline reporters
Roger Twibell (1996)
Bill McDermott (1996–1997)
 Veronica Paysse (2002–2003)
Lorrie Fair (2004)
Brandi Chastain (2005–2006)
Heather Mitts (2005–2006)
Allen Hopkins (2007–2009)
Rob Stone (1997–2011)
Monica Gonzalez (2012–2016)
 Katie Witham (2016)
Julie Stewart-Binks (2017)
Sebastian Salazar (2018–2022)
 Jillian Sakovits (2022)
 Cristina Alexander (2022)

Studio team
 Sebastian Salazar – substitute studio host (2017–2020); lead studio host (2021–2022)
 Alejandro Moreno – lead studio analyst (2014–2022)
 Herculez Gomez – studio analyst (2017–2022)
 Kasey Keller – lead studio analyst (2012–2022)
 Brian Dunseth – studio analyst (2014–2022)
 Max Bretos – lead studio host (2010–2018)
 Adrian Healey – occasional studio host (2019–2020)
 Rob Stone – lead studio host (1997–2011)
 Roger Twibell (1996)
 Ben Olsen – studio analyst (2022)

ESPN
Major League Soccer personalities
Major League Soccer personalities